List of software for cluster management.

Free and open source
 HA
 Apache Mesos, from the Apache Software Foundation
 Kubernetes, founded by Google Inc, from the Cloud Native Computing Foundation
 Heartbeat, from Linux-HA
 Docker Swarm
 Red Hat cluster suite
 OpenShift and OKD, from Red Hat
 Nomad, from HashiCorp
 Rancher, from Rancher Labs
 TrinityX from ClusterVision Solutions
 Corosync Cluster Engine
 OpenSVC
 K3s, from Rancher Labs

 non-HA
 oneSIS
 OpenHPC
 OpenSAF, founded by Motorola, from OpenSAF Foundation, implements Service Availability Forum
 Rocks Cluster Distribution
 Stacki, from StackIQ
 YARN, distributed with Apache Hadoop
 xCAT
 Warewulf
 Foreman

Proprietary
 Amazon Elastic Container Service
 Borg, used at Google
 Bright Cluster Manager, from Bright Computing
 CycleCloud, from Cycle Computing acquired By Microsoft
 IBM Tivoli System Automation for Multiplatforms, from IBM
 Microsoft Cluster Server, from Microsoft
 Twine, from Facebook
 HPE Performance Cluster Manager - HPCM, from Hewlett Packard Enterprise Company
 Dell/EMC - Remote Cluster Manager (RCM)
 Aspen Systems Inc - Aspen Cluster Management Environment (ACME)
 Evidian SafeKit
 IBM PowerHA system mirror
 Veritas Cluster Server

See also
 Comparison of cluster software

References

Cluster computing
Cluster management software